Hansen Spur is a spur,  long, descending from the northwest side of Nilsen Plateau, in the Queen Maud Mountains of Antarctica, and terminating at the edge of Amundsen Glacier just east of the Olsen Crags. It was mapped by the United States Geological Survey from surveys and U.S. Navy air photos, 1960–64, and was named by the Advisory Committee on Antarctic Names for Ludvig Hansen, a member of the sea party aboard the Fram on Amundsen's Norwegian expedition of 1910–12. This naming preserves the spirit of Amundsen's 1911 commemoration of "Mount L. Hansen," a name applied for an unidentified mountain in the general area. The Blackwall Glacier flows northwest along the northeast side of Hansen Spur to join Amundsen Glacier.

References

Ridges of the Ross Dependency
Amundsen Coast